Elesma subglauca, the grey elesma, is a moth of the family Noctuidae first described by Francis Walker in 1865. It is found in the southern half of Australia.

The wingspan is about 40 mm. Adults have grey forewings with a faint tracer pattern. The hindwings are white, shading to grey at the apices.

External links
"Species Elesma subglauca Walker, 1865". Australian Faunal Directory. Archived from  the original 27 November 2012.

Moths of Australia
Chloephorinae
Moths described in 1865